Kenneth Johnson (born December 28, 1963) is a former defensive back in the United States Football League and in the National Football League.

Biography
Johnson was born on December 28, 1963, in Weir, Mississippi. Has a son named Biko Johnson and two daughters named Khenedi and Imani Johnson.

Career
Johnson was drafted by the New Jersey Generals in the 1984 USFL territorial draft and played for the Generals in 1984 and 1985. Johnson played with the Houston Oilers and Green Bay Packers during the 1987 NFL season. He played at the collegiate level at Mississippi State University.

See also
List of Green Bay Packers players

References

People from Choctaw County, Mississippi
Players of American football from Mississippi
Green Bay Packers players
New Jersey Generals players
Houston Oilers players
American football defensive backs
Mississippi State Bulldogs football players
1963 births
Living people
National Football League replacement players